Åge Korsvold (born 8 April 1946) is a Norwegian businessperson and since 2006 chief executive officer of Kistefos.

He was born in Oslo. He is educated in business administration from the University of Pennsylvania in 1971. He started working for Storebrand in 1972 before becoming chief financial officer in Golden West Shipping Co. in 1976 and then in Orkla Industrier in 1977. From 1983 to 1992 Korsvold was consultant in Fondsfinans, and from 1992 to 1994 CEO of Procorp. In 1994 he became CEO in UNI Storebrand.

He played a central role under the failed merger negotiations between UNI Storebrand and Kredittkassen in 1997 and was also central in the acquisition plans for the Swedish-Finninsh MeritaNordbanken in the fall of 1999. In 2000 he was forced to resign, and was later reported by the Norwegian National Authority for the Investigation and Prosecution of Economic and Environmental Crime for illegal option trade.

He was chairman of the board of the Orkla Group briefly in 2000, as he was elected by the corporate council in September, but resigned after leaving Storebrand. He started as CEO of Kistefos in 2001. From 2003 he is also chairman of Ementor.

References

1946 births
Living people
Wharton School of the University of Pennsylvania alumni
Norwegian expatriates in the United States
Chief financial officers
Norwegian chief executives